The 1912 Copa de Honor Cousenier was the final match to decide the winner of the Copa de Honor Cousenier, the 8th. edition of the international competition organised by the Argentine and Uruguayan Associations together. The final was contested by Uruguayan side River Plate and Argentine Racing Club de Avellaneda. 

The match was held in the Estadio Gran Parque Central in Montevideo, on December 8, 1912. River Plate beat Racing Club 2–1, winning its first and only Copa Cousenier trophy.

Qualified teams 

Note

Match details 

|

References

C
1912 in Argentine football
1912 in Uruguayan football